Cornet George Joyce (born 1618) was an officer and Agitator in the Parliamentary New Model Army during the English Civil War.

Between 2 and 5 June 1647, while the New Model Army was assembling for rendezvous at the behest of the recently formed Army Council, Joyce seized King Charles I from Parliament's custody at Holdenby House and took him to Thomas Fairfax's headquarters on Triplo Heath (8 miles south of Cambridge), a move that weakened Parliament's position and strengthened the Army's.

Biography 
Before joining the army, Joyce worked as a tailor in London. According to the Earl of Clarendon in his work, 'The History of the Rebellion', Joyce at one point, "served in a very inferior Employment in Mr. Holles's House."

By 1644, Joyce had enlisted in the Army of the Eastern Association and was serving in Oliver Cromwell's calvary regiment, nicknamed the 'Ironsides'. By 1647, he was commissioned as a Cornet in Sir Thomas Fairfax's lifeguard. Fairfax would later describe Joyce as an "Arch-Agitator."

Seizing the King at Holdenby House 
In 1647, after the conclusion of the First English Civil War, Parliament ordered the New Model Army to disband without full payment of their arrears. In response to this threat, Joyce was tasked with leading a troop of 500 men to take control of Charles I from where he was held in Parliamentary custody at Holdenby House. The plan was possibly formulated by a council of elected representatives of the army, known as 'Agitators,' however Joyce also seemingly received tacit approval from Cromwell after visiting his house on Drury Lane on Mary 31. Cromwell later admitted authorising Joyce to secure the King at Holdenby, but denied giving him orders to move him. 

On June 2, Joyce successfully occupied Holdenby. He soon received word that Colonel Graves, who had been in command of the regiment that was previously guarding the King, had fled the house. Fearful that Graves would return with a superior force and take the King back into Parliament's control, Joyce made the decision to move Charles to Newmarket, where the New Model Army had set up headquarters.

Armed with a pistol, he entered the King's bedchamber in the middle of the night on June 3, and told him that he must leave with his troop the next morning. As they were about to depart, Charles asked to know by what commission Joyce had been authorised to remove him. In reply, Joyce was said to have simply gestured to the 500 troopers who stood behind him.

Fairfax denied any prior knowledge of Joyce's actions and wanted to have him court-martialled. However, Cromwell and Henry Ireton not only interceded on his behalf, but promised him promotion. Eventually Fairfax would come to appreciate Joyce's decision. Concerning his arrest of the King, Joyce reported in a letter:"Lett the Agitators know once more wee have done nothing in our owne name, but what wee have done hath been in the name of the whole Army."

Promotion and later career 
In early 1648, Joyce was promoted to Captain and made governor of Southsea Castle.

According to an account by Sir John Berkley, in 1648, Joyce expressed the view that the King should be brought to trial, so that the parliamentary side "might not bear the blame of the war."

Joyce spoke at the army council debates at Reading in 1648, and at Whitehall in 1649. At Whitehall, he argued that legislative power rested in the hands of the army rather than Parliament, and urged Fairfax and the Grandees to "not to shift off that [power] which the Lord hath called you to." He then claimed that through acting as the instruments of God's will, the council would be able to "remove mountains, [and do] such things as were never yet done by men on earth."

Under the Commonwealth, Joyce became a speculator in confiscated crown lands. By 1651, he owned Portland Castle outright, after buying out his partner Edward Sexby.

On 17 June 1650, Joyce was appointed governor of the Isle of Portland, in the August he was given a commission as lieutenant-colonel in a regiment raised by Colonel James Heane. In October 1651, he accompanied Heane on an expedition to retake Jersey. The expedition was successful; thus the last remaining Royalist stronghold in the British Isles fell to Parliament.

In 1653, Joyce opposed the dissolution of the Rump parliament without a more “righteous and equal Government” to replace it. He was arrested and briefly imprisoned after allegedly stating that Robert Lockyer should have assassinated Cromwell at Bishopsgate. According to Joyce’s own account however, the main reason for his arrest was a property dispute with Richard Cromwell.

Life after the Restoration 
In June 1660, Parliament issued a warrant for Joyce’s arrest after William Lily alleged he had been the masked executioner of Charles I. Consequently, Joyce fled to Rotterdam with his wife and children.

He remained a concern to the newly restored monarchy, and was closely monitored by state intelligence agencies. In 1664 he was implicated, along with several other republican radicals, in a plot to raise a rebel army. 

In 1670, Charles II sent Sir William Temple to Rotterdam to extradite Joyce to England, however Dutch authorities allowed him to escape. It is unknown what happened to him after this.

Notes and references 

1618 births
Roundheads
Year of death unknown